Ranam, also known as Detroit Crossing, is a 2018 Indian Malayalam-language action thriller film written and directed by Nirmal Sahadev. The film stars Prithviraj Sukumaran, Rahman and Isha Talwar in the leading roles. It was released on 6 September 2018.

Plot
A wounded person named Aadhi narrates that how Detroit, the city that is situated in the US-Canada border, lost its charm some decades back, where he makes some curious comparisons to the plight of some of the upper caste households losing their might in Kerala and also describes how much everyone suffers from escaping to Toronto. Aadhi, who was formerly working for Damodar as a getaway driver and drug dealer, is now working in a mechanic at a garage owned by his uncle Bhaskaran, whose son Aju has a crush on his classmate Deepika, the daughter of Seema, who gave birth and got married at a young age.

Deepika, who is a drug addict, has no respect for Seema. Moreover, Rajan, who is Seema's husband, currently has no regard for her as a wife. Being a business tycoon, Rajan is flirty and has extramarital affairs with his female colleagues  and secretary. Ahmed, an investigation officer, is an ex-boyfriend of Seema, and knows about her bad condition very well. Damodar, who wants Aadhi to work under him again, decides to negotiate. Later, he entrusts Aju to transport the latest party drug Redex via Aju's friend, who is Damodar's aide. Aju is saved by Aadhi before he gets caught by the cops. Bhaskar sends Aju to live with his relative. Deepika, who had fallen for Aadhi (whom she always meets with Aju), leaves her house to meet him, but Aadhi asks her to leave, where she refuses and later leaves after forcefully buying a packet of Redex from him.

That night, Deepika overdoses on Redex and dies, where Aadhi feels guilty about being responsible. Seema, who is shattered at Deepika's death, leaves her home after finding out that Rajan is cheating on her and continuing his affairs despite his daughter's death. While travelling to Ahmed's house, a group of eve-teasers try to molest her, but Aadhi, who was with Seema all through the journey, saves her from them and safely drops Seema at Ahmed's home. Ahmed's wife is disturbed at Seema's presence which causes Seema to voluntarily leave the house. Aadhi takes Seema to his own house, and the two of them fall for each other.

However, Seema is shattered to know from Ahmed that Aadhi is the part of the gang, which lead to her daughter's death where she leaves his house. Damodar plans to trigger a major attack during an important festivity in the city, by killing three important aides of Antoni, the leader of the rival Polish gang. Damodar appoints his brother Selvam, Aadhi and Bhaskaran to carry out his operation. Aadhi is directed to park a car at the lot of a building in the heart of the city where the Polish gang is to have an emergency meeting. During parking of the car, Aadhi finds a bomb at the rear end that will blast in one day's time. Bhaskar fails to carry out a killing commissioned by Damodar, where he begs Damodar to leave him and his family alone, but gets killed by Damodar.

Enraged, Aadhi finishes Selvam and confronts Damodar at the same building in which he parked the car. A fight ensues, in which Aadhi is shot dangerously, but overpowers Damodar and stabs him. It is shown that Aadhi had informed  Antoni and his friends about Damodar's location. Antoni and his thugs arrive and kill Damodar by opening fire at him. As Aadhi walks away injured, locking the door. the bomb blasts killing everyone inside. The dangerously injured Aadhi walks to Ahmed's office and collapses. Aadhi had informed Seema to visit his house and check his car, which had an amount of money, and tells that half of it should be given to Bhaskaran's wife and the other half is for herself, and also asks her to leave far off place (Toronto) for a new start. After this, A still alive Aadhi suddenly regains consciousness.

Cast  
 Prithviraj Sukumaran as Aadhi, an orphan mechanic raised in Detroit, one of Damodar’s top drug dealers.
 Rahman as Damodar Ratnam, a Sri Lankan Tamilian drug lord, who dreams to own Detroit.
 Isha Talwar as Seema, a dance teacher in Detroit, who married and gave birth to her daughter at a very young age. 
 Nandhu as Bhaskar, a middle-aged mechanic in Detroit; Aadhi's uncle.
 Arun Baby Mathew  as Aju, a high-school student; son of Bhasker.
 Celine Joseph as Deepika, a high-school student; daughter of Seema.
 Ashwin Kumar as Selvan, brother of Damodar, who is often seen as his sidekick during drug dealings.
 Giju John as Detective Ahmed Siddique, a detective, specialized for drug dealers in Detroit; known for being a polyglot.
 Shyamaprasad as Chandran, a mediator among drug dealers; who owns a restaurant in Detroit.
 Shivajith Padmanabhan as Rajan Kuriakose
 Justin David as Sean
 Santhosh Keezhattoor as Swaminathan, Aadhi's father

Production

Development 
The film was first announced by Prithviraj Sukumaran in July 2016 through his Facebook page. He has mentioned that 'Ivide' was his first honest attempt at a cross over the film from Malayalam, and his second one will be 'Ranam/Detroit Crossing'. Ranam is produced by Anand Payannur and Lawson Biju under the banner Yes Cinema Productions and Lawson Entertainment.

Casting 
Initially, Mamta Mohandas was cast as the female lead paired opposite Prithviraj Sukumaran, but was replaced by Isha Talwar as the former was unable to allocate dates due to her prior commitment for Carbon. The film's schedule was postponed following certain technical issues. Tamil Actors Sampath Raj and Ashwin K. Kumar was confirmed by director in March 2017. Malayalam actor Rahman replaced actor Sampath in the role and had joined the cast in October 2017.

Filming  
The filming began in Augusta, Georgia on 22 August 2017. Later the crew shifted to Atlanta, Georgia and Detroit, Michigan to shoot the remaining portions. Over 95 per cent of the film was shot in the United States, and remaining portions in Kerala. Filming was completed in 45 days.

Music
The original soundtrack and background score were composed by Jakes Bejoy. The title track of the film was released on YouTube in March 2018, as a part of a promotion.

Release
Ranam was released on 6 September 2018 across 150 theaters in Kerala. Rest of India release was on 7 September and outside India on 13 September.

References

External links 
 
 

2018 films
Indian action thriller films
Films shot in Atlanta
Films shot in Detroit
Films shot in Kerala
Films shot in Georgia (U.S. state)
Films scored by Jakes Bejoy
2010s Malayalam-language films
2018 action thriller films
Films about Indian Americans
Films set in Detroit